Sasu may refer to the following places:

 Sasu, a tributary of the Botiza in Romania
 Sasu (Strei), a tributary of the Strei in Romania
 Sasu, a tributary of the Izvor in Romania
 Sasul, a tributary of the Lotrioara in Sibiu County, Romania
 Sasu Station, a railway station in North Korea
 Sasu River (Korea) - river in Korea
 Société par actions simplifiée
Marius Sasu
Mircea Sasu
Niculina Sasu

See also
 Sas (disambiguation)
 Sașa (disambiguation)
 Șasa (disambiguation)

Romanian-language surnames